Ondol (Hangul: 온돌, 溫堗) or gudeul (Hangul: 구들) in Korean traditional architecture, is underfloor heating that uses direct heat transfer from wood smoke to heat the underside of a thick masonry floor.  In modern usage it refers to any type of underfloor heating, or to a hotel or a sleeping room in Korean (as opposed to Western) style.

The main components of the traditional ondol are an agungi (firebox or stove) accessible from an adjoining room (typically kitchen or master bedroom), a raised masonry floor underlain by horizontal smoke passages, and a vertical, freestanding chimney on the opposite exterior wall providing a draft.  The heated floor, supported by stone piers or baffles to distribute the smoke, is covered by stone slabs, clay and an impervious layer such as oiled paper.

History

Origin
Use of the ondol has been found at archaeological sites in present-day North Korea. A Neolithic Age archaeological site, circa 5000 BC, discovered in Unggi, Hamgyeongbuk-do, in present-day North Korea, shows a clear vestige of gudeul in the excavated dwelling.

Early ondols began as gudeul that provided the heating for a home and for cooking. When a fire was lit in the furnace to cook rice for dinner, the flame would extend horizontally because the flue entry was beside the furnace. This arrangement was essential, as it would not allow the smoke to travel upward, which would cause the flame to go out too soon. As the flame would pass through the flue entrance, it would be guided through the network of passages with the smoke. Entire rooms would be built on the furnace flue to create ondol floored rooms.

Etymology
The term gudeul is a native Korean word. According to a Korean folkloric historian Son Jintae (1900 - missing during the 1950-53 Korean War), gudeul originated from guun-dol (Korean), which means "heated stone", and its pronunciation has changed into gudol or gudul, and again into gudeul. 

The term ondol is Sino-Korean and was introduced around the end of the 19th century.  Alternate names include (janggaeng, hwagaeng, nandol, and yeondol).

Use
Ondol had traditionally been used as a living space for sitting, eating, sleeping and other pastimes in most Korean homes before the 1960s. Koreans are accustomed to sitting and sleeping on the floor, and working and eating at low tables instead of raised tables with chairs. The furnace burned mainly rice paddy straws, agricultural crop waste, biomass or any kind of dried firewood. For short-term cooking, rice paddy straws or crop waste was preferred, while long hours of cooking and floor heating needed longer-burning firewood. Unlike modern-day water heaters, the fuel was either sporadically or regularly burned (two to five times a day), depending on frequency of cooking and seasonal weather conditions.

With the traditional ondol heating, the floor closer to the furnace was normally warm enough, and the warmest spots reserved for elders and honored guests. Ondol had problems such as environmental pollution and carbon monoxide poisoning resulting from burning coal briquettes. Thus, other technology heats modern Korean homes.

The famous American architect, Frank Lloyd Wright, was building a hotel in Japan, and was invited to a Japanese family's house. The homeowner had experienced the ondol in Korea, and he built an ondol room in his house. Wright reportedly was so impressed  that he invented radiant floor heating which uses hot water as the heating medium. Some of Wright's buildings employed this system.

Instead of ondol-hydronic radiant floor heating, modern-day houses such as high-rise apartments have a modernized version of the ondol system. Many architects know the advantages and benefits of ondol, and they are using ondol in modern houses. Since the ondol has been introduced to many countries, it is beginning to be considered as one of the systems of home heating. Modern ondol are not the same as the original version. Almost all Koreans use modern versions, so it is hard to find the traditional ondol system in Korean houses. North Korea still utilizes the basic traditional design of the Ondol that use mostly coal instead of biomass to survive the harsh winters.

Advantages and disadvantages
One of the advantages of an Ondol is that it can maintain heat for an extended period. In a traditional Korean house, people usually extinguish the fire before going to sleep at night, since it can stay warm until the morning. An ondol conducts heat evenly throughout the whole room, although the part of the room closest to the agungi is much warmer. Comparing the Ondol with the Western radiator: the heat from the radiator rises towards the ceiling, but Ondol keeps both the floor and the air in the room warm. The advantage of the Ondol is that people do not have to worry about breakdown and repair of the Ondol.  The Ondol is part of the house, therefore, it is less likely to run into problems. Any combustible materials can be used as fuel for the Ondol; there are no special fuel requirements. In contrast to heaters, such as fireplaces or charcoal-based heaters that leave ash in the room, Ondol does not cause pollution in the room leaving it clean and warm.  

The Ondol has some disadvantages. Mud and stones are one of the main materials that make up the Ondol. Such materials take quite a long time to heat up, therefore the room takes a long time to warm up. In addition, it is difficult to adjust the temperature of the room.

Dol bed
The dol bed, or stone bed, is a manufactured bed that has the same heating effect as ondol.  The dol bed industry is estimated to be worth 100 billion Korean won, comprising 30 to 40 percent of the entire bed industry in South Korea; dol beds are most popular with middle-aged people in their 40s and 50s.

See also

Underfloor heating
Korean architecture
Culture of Korea
Hypocaust
Rocket mass heater
Gloria (heating system)
Kang bed-stove 
Masonry heater
Frank Lloyd Wright

References

External links

The Herbert Offen Research Collection of the Phillips Library at the Peabody Essex Museum

Architecture in Korea
Heating
Energy in South Korea
Korean culture
Korean inventions
Residential heating appliances